Girls Will Be Boys is a 1934 British comedy film directed by Marcel Varnel and starring Dolly Haas, Cyril Maude and Esmond Knight. It is based on The Last Lord, a play by Kurt Siodmak. The film was shot at Elstree Studios with sets designed by the art director Cedric Dawe. Haas made this, her first English-language film, following a Nazi-led riot at the premiere of her previous film Das häßliche Mädchen, and in 1936 fled Germany altogether.

Plot
A young woman dresses up as a boy to fool a wealthy misogynist.

Cast
 Dolly Haas as Pat Caverley
 Cyril Maude as Duke of Bridgwater
 Esmond Knight as Geoffrey Dawson
 Irene Vanbrugh as Princess of Ehrenstein
 Edward Chapman as Grey
 Ronald Ward as Bernard
 Charles Paton as Sanders
 H. F. Maltby as General
 Robert Rietty as Boy

References

Bibliography
 Bock, Hans-Michael & Bergfelder, Tim. The Concise Cinegraph: Encyclopaedia of German Cinema. Berghahn Books, 2009.
 Nash, Jay Robert & Ross, Stanley Ralph. The Motion Picture Guide. Cinebooks, 1986.

External links

1934 films
1934 comedy films
Films shot at British International Pictures Studios
Films directed by Marcel Varnel
Cross-dressing in film
British comedy films
British black-and-white films
1930s English-language films
1930s British films